Yuta Iwashita (born 21 June 1991) is a Japanese handball player. He competed in the 2020 Summer Olympics.

References

1991 births
Living people
Handball players at the 2020 Summer Olympics
Japanese male handball players
Olympic handball players of Japan